At the 1952 Summer Olympics, 16 wrestling events were contested, for all men. There were eight weight classes in Greco-Roman wrestling and eight classes in freestyle wrestling. The events were held at Messuhalli.

Medal summary

Greco-Roman

Freestyle

Participating nations
A total of 244 wrestlers from 37 nations competed at the Helsinki Games:

Medal table

See also
List of World and Olympic Champions in men's freestyle wrestling
List of World and Olympic Champions in Greco-Roman wrestling

References

 
1952 Summer Olympics events
1952
1952 in sport wrestling